Jérémy De Magalhaes (born 21 November 1983 in Ivry-sur-Seine, Val-de-Marne) is a French footballer. He has played football in the second and third divisions in France for Stade Lavallois and AS Cannes. He went on trial at Barnet in July 2008 and initially rejected an offer of a contract but returned to the Bees in August to sign with the club. However, he had problems with injury, only making four appearances, and his persistent injury problems led him to be released before the end of the season in April. In July 2010, he returned to AS Cannes. After a one-year stint at Cannes, he signed with FC Martigues in the Championnat National in July 2011. In July 2012, he joined amateur club Hyères FC.

References

External links
 
 
 
 
 Jérémy De Magalhaes at Foot-National.com
 

1983 births
Living people
People from Ivry-sur-Seine
Association football defenders
French footballers
French expatriate footballers
Stade Lavallois players
AS Cannes players
Entente SSG players
Barnet F.C. players
FC Martigues players
Ligue 2 players
English Football League players
Expatriate footballers in England
Footballers from Val-de-Marne